Scolecenchelys vermiformis is an eel in the family Ophichthidae (worm/snake eels). It was described by Wilhelm Peters in 1866, originally under the genus Chilorhinus. It is a marine, tropical eel which is known from Sri Lanka, in the western Indian Ocean.

References

Fish described in 1866
vermiformis
Taxa named by Wilhelm Peters